Marvin Allen "Marv" Upshaw (born November 22, 1946 in Robstown, Texas) is a former American football defensive lineman in the National Football League. He played nine seasons for the Cleveland Browns (1968–1969), the Kansas City Chiefs (1970–1975) and the St. Louis Cardinals (1976).

He is the younger brother of the late Gene Upshaw, who was an offensive lineman for the Oakland Raiders, executive director of the National Football League Players' Association (NFLPA) after retiring as an active player, and a member of the Pro Football Hall of Fame.

1946 births
Living people
People from Robstown, Texas
Players of American football from Texas
American football defensive ends
American football defensive tackles
Trinity Tigers football players
Cleveland Browns players
Kansas City Chiefs players
St. Louis Cardinals (football) players